Johan Eiswohld (born 21 June 1990) is a Swedish footballer.

Career

Early career
Eiswohld came up through the ranks at Lunds BK before moving to Helsingborgs in 2007.

Helsingborgs
Eiswohld was a product of the Helsingborgs academy. He spent four years with the club, only making eleven league appearances.

Angelholm
In March 2012, Eiswohld moved to Ängelholms FF in the Superettan. He made his league debut on 6 April 2012 in a 1-1 draw with Trelleborgs. He was subbed on for Tobias Johansson in the 74th minute. His first career goal came on 28 May 2012 in a 3-1 win over Umeå FC. His goal came was the last of the game and came in the 80th minute.

Sirius
In January 2017, Eiswohld was sold to IK Sirius. He made his league debut on 3 April 2017 in a 2-0 win against Djurgårdens.

Honors
Helsingborgs
Allsvenskan: 2011

Svenska Cupen: 2010, 2011

Svenska Supercupen: 2011

References

External links

1990 births
Living people
Association football midfielders
Helsingborgs IF players
Ängelholms FF players
IK Sirius Fotboll players
Swedish footballers
Allsvenskan players
Superettan players